This is a list of oceanography institutions and programs worldwide. Oceanographic institutions and programs are broadly defined as places where scientific research is carried out relating to oceanography. This list is organized geographically. Some oceanographic institutions are standalone programs, such as non-governmental organizations or government-funded agencies. Other oceanographic institutions are departments within colleges and universities. While oceanographic research happens at many other departments at other colleges and universities, such as Biology and Geology departments, this list focuses on larger departments and large research centers specifically devoted to oceanography and marine science. Aquaria are not listed here.

International

International oceanographic programs
 Intergovernmental Oceanographic Commission, UNESCO
 International Council for the Exploration of the Sea, (ICES)
 International Hydrographic Organization
 International Ocean Discovery Program, formerly called the Integrated Ocean Drilling Program.
 InterRidge, an international research collaboration on oceanic seafloor spreading zones.
 Mediterranean Science Commission, (CIESM)
 North Pacific Marine Science Organization (PICES)
 Scientific Committee on Oceanic Research, part of the International Science Council.

Societies and professional affiliations
 American Geophysical Union
 Association for the Sciences of Limnology and Oceanography
 Coastal and Estuarine Research Federation
 European Geosciences Union
 The Oceanography Society

Institutions by country

Australia
 Australian Institute of Marine Science, Queensland. AIMS
 Australian Meteorological and Oceanographic Society, a scholarly society. AMOS
 Commonwealth Scientific and Industrial Research Organisation, Canberra. CSIRO
 Institute for Marine and Antarctic Studies, Hobart, Tasmania. IMAS
 University of New South Wales, Sydney. Coastal and Regional Oceanography Lab

Bangladesh
 Bangabandhu Sheikh Mujibur Rahman Maritime University, Dhaka. BSMRMU
 Bangladesh Oceanographic Research Institute, Ramu, Cox's Bazar. BORI
 Institute of Marine Sciences, University of Chittagong was the country's first marine research institution, inaugurated in 1971.
 Patuakhali Science and Technology University, Dumki-8602, Patuakhali. Department of Marine Fisheries and Oceanography (MFO)
 Shahjalal University of Science & Technology, Sylhet. Department of Oceanography
 Sylhet Agricultural University, Sylhet-3100. Department of Coastal and Marine Fisheries
 University of Dhaka, Department of Oceanography

Belgium
 European Global Ocean Observing System, Brussels. 
 European Marine Board, an international organization based in Oostende, Belgium. European Marine Board
 Flanders Marine Institute, Oostende. VLIZ 
 University of Liège, Interfacultary Center for Marine Research MARE

Belize
 Wee Wee Caye Marine Lab on an island off the coast of Stann Creek District.

Bermuda
 Bermuda Institute of Ocean Sciences, an independent science and education institute in Ferry Reach, St. Georges. BIOS

Brazil
Brazilian national programs:
 Admiral Paulo Moreira Institute for Marine Studies in Arraial do Cabo, Rio de Janeiro is associated with the Brazilian Navy. IEAPM 
 National Institute for Oceanographic and Waterway Research. INPOH 
 National Institute for Space Research in São Paulo conducts ocean remote sensing research. INPE

Brazilian universities with oceanography departments or institutes:
 Centro Universitário Monte Serrat. Oceanografia, UNIMONTE
 Center for Marine Studies in Pontal do Paraná, associated with the Federal University of Paraná.
 Fundação Universidade Federal do Rio Grande. FURG
 Oceanographic Institute of the University of São Paulo. USP
 Universidade do Vale do Itajaí. UNIVALI Oceanography
 Universidade do Estado do Rio de Janeiro. Faculdade de Oceanografia, UERJ
 Universidade Federal da Bahia. Curso de Graduação em Oceanografia, UFBA
 Universidade Federal de São Paulo. Departamento de Ciências do Mar, UNIFESP
 Universidade Federal de Santa Catarina. UFSC 
 Universidade Federal do Ceará. UFC
 Universidade Federal do Espírito Santo. Oceanografia na UFES
 Universidade Federal do Maranhão. UFMA
 Universidade Federal do Pará. UFPA
 Universidade Federal do Paraná. UFPR
 Universidade Federal do Pernambuco. UFPE

Bulgaria
 Agricultural Academy Institute of Fish Resources in Varna. Institute of Fish Resources
 Bulgarian Academy of Sciences in Varna. Institute of Oceanology

Cameroon
 National Oceanographic Data Centre of Cameroon. NODC

Canada
 Bamfield Marine Sciences Centre, a marine research station in Barkley Sound, British Columbia associated with several nearby universities. Bamfield MSC
 Bedford Institute of Oceanography, a governmental research facility in Dartmouth, Nova Scotia. BIO
 Bellairs Research Institute in Barbados is a field station of McGill University. Bellairs
 Canadian Meteorological and Oceanographic Society. CMOS
 Dalhousie University, Halifax, Nova Scotia. Oceanography Department
 Fisheries and Oceans Canada, organized into seven administrative regions of Canada. Fisheries and Oceans Canada
 Institute of Ocean Sciences in British Columbia, operated by Fisheries and Oceans Canada.
 Maurice Lamontagne Institute in Mont Joli, Quebec, operated by Fisheries and Oceans Canada.
 Memorial University, St. John's, Newfoundland and Labrador. Fisheries and Marine Institute
 Northwest Atlantic Fisheries Centre in St. Johns, Newfoundland and Labrador. NAFC
 Ocean Frontier Institute, housed at the Memorial University of Newfoundland and Dalhousie University. OFI
 Ocean Networks Canada, an ocean observing program run by the University of Victoria similar to the Ocean Observatories Initiative.
 Université du Québec à Rimouski, Institut des Sciences de la mer ISMER

China
 Chinese Academy of Sciences, Institute of Oceanology. Institute of Oceanology
 Chinese Academy of Sciences, South China Sea Institute of Oceanology. SCSIO
 East China Normal University's State Key Laboratory of Estuarine and Coastal Research SKLEC
 Ocean University of China in Qingdao, Shandong. OUC
 State Key Laboratory of Satellite Ocean Environment Dynamics in Hangzhou. SOED
 State Oceanic Administration, First Institute of Oceanography. FIO 
 State Oceanic Administration, Second Institute of Oceanography.  SIO.
 The University of Hong Kong's Swire Institute of Marine Science on the Cape d'Aguilar Peninsula on Hong Kong Island. SWIMS

Colombia
Colombian national programs:
 Centro de Investigaciones Oceanográficas e Hidrográficas del Caribe, General Maritime Directorate. CIOH
 Centro de Investigaciones Oceanográficas e Hidrográficas del Pacífico, General Maritime Directorate. CCCP
 José Benito Vives de Andréis Marine and Coastal Research Institute in Santa Marta, Magdalena. INVEMAR

Colombian universities with oceanography programs:
 Colombian Naval Academy: Escuela Naval de Cadetes "Almirante Padilla" in Cartagena, Oceanography program.
 EAFIT University in Medellín, Marine Sciences Group.
 National University of Colombia’s School of Mines in Medellín, Oceanography and Coastal Engineering Research Group. OCEANICOS
 Universidad Jorge Tadeo Lozano in Bogotá, Dynamics and Management of Coastal Marine Ecosystems program DIMARCO
 University of Antioquia offers Oceanography undergraduate program and Marine Sciences doctorate program.

Croatia
 Institute of Oceanography and Fisheries in Split is supported by the Croatian Science Foundation. IOR
 Ruđer Bošković Institute, Center for Marine Research in Rovinj. CMR
 University of Dubrovnik, Institute for Marine and Coastal Research. IMP-DU

Denmark
Danish Maritime Safety Administration in Copenhagen. DaMSA
Technical University of Denmark in Copenhagen.
Copenhagen University's Research Centre on Ocean, Climate, and Society. ROCS

Ecuador
 Escuela Superior Politécnica del Litoral has programs in Marine Engineering, Biological Sciences, and Natural Resources. FIMCBOR
 Instituto Oceanográfico de la Armada, part of the Ecuadorian Navy, in Guayaquil. INOCAR

Finland
 Finnish Environment Institute's Marine Research Center. SYKE
 Finnish Institute of Marine Research in Helsinki.
 Finnish Meteorological Institute's Marine Research unit. FMI

France
 Académie de Marine, originally the Royal Naval Academy of France. Académie de Marine
 Banyuls-sur-Mer Oceanographic Observatory, also called Laboratoire Arago. OOB
 European University Institute of Marine Sciences in Brest. IUEM
 French Research Institute for Exploitation of the Sea in Brest. IFREMER
 Institut océanographique de Paris, associated with an organization with the same name in Monaco.
 Institute of Environmental Geosciences in Grenoble, associated with the Grenoble Alps University. IGE
 Laboratory of Space Geophysical and Oceanographic Studies in Toulouse. LEGOS 
 Lille University of Science and Technology's Wimereaux Marine Station 
 Marine Biological Station and Concarneau Marinarium, associated with the French National Museum of Natural History. Station Marine de Concarneau
 Marine Station of Arcachon, associated with the University Bordeaux, on Arcachon Bay. Station marine d'Arcachon
 Mediterranean Institute of Oceanography in Marseille. MIO
 Naval Hydrographic and Oceanographic Service in Brest. SHOM
 Laboratoire d'Océanographie de Villefranche-sur-Mer on the French Riviera. [www.obs-vlfr.fr Obs-Vlfr]
 Oceanography and Climate Laboratory in Paris LOCEAN
 Paul Ricard Oceanographic Institute on the island of Embiez near Six-Fours-les-Plages.
 Roscoff Marine Station, associated with Sorbonne University, is the oldest marine research station in the world. SB-Roscoff

Germany
 Alfred Wegener Institute for Polar and Marine Research in Bremerhaven. AWI
 Center for Marine Environmental Sciences in Bremen. MARUM
 GEOMAR Helmholtz Centre for Ocean Research Kiel. GEOMAR
 German Marine Research Consortium in Berlin. KDM
 Helmholtz-Zentrum Hereon in Geesthacht, part of the Helmholtz Association, has research programs in marine sciences. HZG
 Institute for Chemistry and Biology of the Marine Environment in Oldenburg, Wilhelmshaven. ICBM
 Integrated School of Ocean Sciences at Kiel University. ISOS
 Leibniz Institute for Baltic Sea Research in Warnemünde .IOW
 Leibniz Centre for Tropical Marine Research in Bremen. ZMT
 Max Planck Institute for Meteorology in Hamburg. MPI-M
 Senckenberg by the Sea in Wilhelmshaven. Senckenberg am Meer 
 The Future Ocean, a collaborative research group based out of Kiel.
 University of Hamburg's Institute of Oceanography. IfM

Greece
 Hellenic Centre for Marine Research in Anavyssos. HCMR
 University of the Aegean in Mytilene, Lesvos. Department of Marine Sciences

Iceland
 Marine and Freshwater Research Institute in Hafnarfjörður, associated with the Ministry of Industries and Innovation. MFRI
 University of Iceland's Marine Academic Research in Iceland group in Reykjavik. MARICE

India
Indian national programs:
Center for Marine Living Resources in Kerala, under the Ministry of Earth Sciences. CMLRE
Central Marine Fisheries Research Institute, Kochi, Kerala, under the Indian Council of Agricultural Research. CMFRI
National Centre for Ocean Information Services in Pragathi Nagar, Hyderabad. ESSO-INCOIS
National Institute of Oceanography in Goa.
National Atmospheric Research Laboratory in Andhra, Pradesh. NARL
National Centre for Polar and Ocean Research in Goa. NCAOR
National Centre for Sustainable Coastal Management in Chennai, Tamil Nadu. NCSCM
National Institute of Ocean Technology in Chennai, Tamil Nadu. NIOT
National Center for Coastal Research in Chennai, under the Ministry of Earth Sciences. NCCR
National Centre for Earth Science Studies in Kerala. NCESS

Indian universities with oceanography programs:
 
Central:
University of Allahabad, K. Banerjee Centre for Atmospheric and Ocean Studies. KBCAOS

Eastern:
Indian Institute of Technology Kharagpur’s Centre for Oceans, Rivers, Atmosphere and Land Sciences (CORAL) in West Bengal.
Berhampur University, Department of Marine Sciences, Odisha.
University of Calcutta, Department of Marine Science, Kolkata. MarineSc
Jadavpur University, School of Oceanographic Studies, Kolkata. Ocean-JU
Indian Institute of Technology Bhubaneswar, School of Earth, Ocean and Climate Sciences, Odisha. IIT Bhubaneswar OC

Northern:
Indian Institute of Technology Delhi, Centre for Atmospheric Sciences. CAS
Central University of Punjab, Bathinda.

Southern:
Academy of Maritime Education and Training in Chennai, Tamil Nadu.
Andhra University, Department of Meteorology and Oceanography.
Anna University, Institute of Ocean Management, Chennai, Tamil Nadu. IOM
Annamalai University, Center of Advanced Study in Marine Biology, Tamil Nadu. CASMB
Alagappa University, Karaikudi, Tamil Nadu. Department of Fisheries Science Department of Oceanography and Coastal Area Studies, Alagappa University, Karaikudi, Tamil Nadu.
Bharathidasan University, Tiruchirappalli.  Department of Marine Science
Cochin University of Science and Technology in Kerala. has several departments in its School of Marine Sciences. SMSCUSAT
Indian Institute of Science ‘s Centre for Atmospheric and Oceanic Sciences in Bengalaru. CAOS
Kerala University of Fisheries and Ocean Studies in Kochi, Kerala. 
Madurai Kamaraj University, School of Energy Environment & Natural Resources, Tamil Nadu. SEENR
Manonmaniam Sundaranar University, Centre for Marine Science and Technology, Rajakkamangalam, Kanyakumari. CMST
M.E.S. Ponnani College, Ponnani, Malappuram, Kerala. Department of Aquaculture and Fishery Microbiology
Nansen Environmental Research Centre India, Kerala, established by joint Norwegian and Indian partners, now a research center of Kerala University. NERCI 
Pondicherry University, Department of Ocean Studies and Marine Biology, Port Blair, Andaman Islands. Center for Ocean and Island Studies
St. Albert's College, Kochi, Kerala. Department of Fisheries & Aquaculture
University of Hyderabad, Center for Earth, Ocean, and Atmospheric Sciences, formerly called the formerly Centre for Earth and Space Sciences. CEOAS
University of Kerala, Department of Aquatic Biology and Fisheries.
University of Madras, Centre for Ocean and Coastal Studies, Chennai, Tamil Nadu. COCS

Western:
Goa University, Department of Marine Sciences. Department of Marine Sciences

Indonesia
Bandung Institute of Technology has programs in Oceanography under the Faculty of Earth Sciences and Technology and Ocean Engineering under the Faculty of Civil and Environmental Engineering.
Bogor Agricultural Institute, Department of Marine Science and Technology.
Diponegoro University, Faculty of Fisheries and Marine Sciences, Semarang, Central Java.
Indonesian Institute of Sciences’s Research Center for Oceanography, Jakarta. Puslit Oseanografi LIPI
University of Riau, Marine Science Department, Pekanbaru.

Iran
Tarbiat Modares University, Marine Science Faculty, Tehran.
Iranian National Institute for Oceanography and Atmospheric Science, Tehran.
Khorramshahr Marine Science and Technology University, Khorramshahr. KMSU
Islamic Azad University, Science and Research Branch, Tehran, Faculty of Marine Science and Technologies.

Ireland
Marine Institute Ireland, a state agency in Galway.
National University of Ireland, Galway, Ryan Institute for Environmental, Marine and Energy Research. The Ryan Institute
University College Cork, SFI Research Centre for Energy, Climate and Marine research and innovation. MaREI

Israel
Ben-Gurion University of the Negev, Beersheba. Department of Earth and Environmental Sciences
Israel Oceanographic & Limnological Research Institute, which has research centers in Haifa, Kinneret, and Eilat. IOLR 
University of Haifa, The Leon H. Charney School of Marine Sciences in Haifa. MarSci Haifa

Italy
Italian National Research Council, Institute of Marine Sciences in Venice. CNR-ISMAR
National Institute of Oceanography and Experimental Geophysics (Istituto Nazionale di Oceanografia e di Geofisica Sperimentale) in Sgonico. OGS
National Inter-University Consortium of Marine Sciences, a collaboration between 35 Italian Universities. CoNISMa

Japan
Okinawa Institute of Science and Technology in Onna, Okinawa, includes Marine Science as one subject in the multi-disciplinary research profile of the graduate program. OIST
Japan Agency for Marine-Earth Science and Technology in Yokosuka, Kanagawa. JAMSTEC
Tokyo University of Marine Science and Technology in Koto, Tokyo. TUMSAT
Kobe University, Department of Oceanology, Kobe, Hyogo. Faculty of Oceanology
University of the Ryukyus in Nakagami, Okinawa includes Oceanography and Marine Biology as areas of study. Faculty of Science
 Usa Marine Biological Institute in Usa, Kochi.

Latvia
Institute of Food Safety, Animal Health and Environment “BIOR” in Riga conducts research in the areas of Environmental Science and Fisheries. BIOR
Latvian Institute of Aquatic Ecology, Riga. LIAE

Lithuania
Klaipėda University, Coastal Research and Planning Institute, on the Baltic Sea coast.

Mexico
Autonomous University of Baja California, Ensenada, Institute for Oceanographic Research, and Faculty of Marine Sciences. UABC IIO, UABC Facultad de Ciencias Marinas
Autonomous University of Sinaloa, Faculty of Marine Sciences in Mazatlán.
Centro de Investigaciones Biológicas del Noroeste S.C, under the direction of the Consejo Nacional de Ciencia y Tecnología (Mexico), in La Paz, Baja California Sur. CIBNOR
Centro Interdisciplinario de Ciencias Marinas del Instituto Politécnico Nacional, located in La Paz, Baja California Sur. CICIMAR
El Colegio de la Frontera Sur, in Chetumal, Quintana Roo on the Yucatán Peninsula, under the direction of the Consejo Nacional de Ciencia y Tecnología (Mexico).  ECOSUR
Ensenada Center for Scientific Research and Higher Education on the Pacific Coast of the Baja Peninsula.  CICESE
National Autonomous University of Mexico, Instituto de Ciencias del Mar y Limnología, campuses in México City, Mazatlán and Puerto Morelos. ICMYL
Universidad del Mar, Puerto Ángel, Oaxaca UMAR
University of Colima, Facultad de Ciencias Marinas. FACIMAR

Monaco
Institut océanographique, associated with the organization of the same name in Paris, France. Oceano

Netherlands
 Royal Netherlands Institute for Sea Research on the island of Texel, and in Yerseke. NIOZ
 University of Groningen, program in Marine Biology. RUG Marine Biology

New Zealand
Cawthron Institute  in Nelson on the South Island. Cawthron
National Institute of Water and Atmospheric Research, whose head office is in Auckland but with several other sites across New Zealand, was formerly part of the N.Z. Oceanographic Institute. NIWA
Victoria University Coastal Ecology Laboratory on the Wellington coast of the North Island. WUCEL

Norway
Geophysical Institute, University of Bergen.
Norwegian Institute of Marine Research in Tromsø.
Norwegian Polar Institute in Tromsø.
University of Tromsø’s Norwegian College of Fishery Science and Department of Arctic and Marine Biology.

Pakistan
Lasbela University of Agriculture, Water & Marine Science, Balochistan. LUAWMS 
National Institute of Oceanography, part of the Ministry of Science and Technology. NIOPK

Philippines
Marine Science Institute, part of the University of the Philippines, UP Diliman, in Quezon City. MSI

Poland
Institute of Oceanology, Polish Academy of Science, Sopok. IO PAN
National Marine Fisheries Research Institute, Gdynia. MIR
University of Gdańsk, Institute of Oceanography. UG Oceanography
Maritime Institute in Gdańsk. IM GDA
Polish Polar Station, Hornsund in Svalbard in the Arctic Ocean.

Portugal
Centre of Marine Sciences in Faro. CCMAR
Hydrographic Institute in Lisbon. Instituto Hidrografico
 Department of Oceanography and Fisheries, University of Azores in Horta, Faial.
Interdisciplinary Centre of Marine and Environmental Research in Matosinhos. CIIMAR
Marine Biology Station of Funchal on the island of Madeira.
Marine and Environmental Sciences Centre, a multi-university collaboration. MARE

Russia
Marine Hydrophysical Institute, Russian Academy of Sciences. MHI
Nikolai M. Knipovich Polar Research Institute of Marine Fisheries and Oceanography in Murmansk.
Russian State Hydrometeorological University in St. Petersburg.
Saint Petersburg State University, Department of Oceanography.
Shirshov Institute of Oceanology, Russian Academy of Sciences.

South Africa
South African Association for Marine Biological Research in KwaZulu-Natal. SAAMBR
Department of Oceanography, University of Cape Town

South Korea
 Korea Institute of Ocean Science and Technology.  KIOST
 Pusan National University, Department of Oceanography.
 Seoul National University, School of Earth and Environmental Sciences.

Spain
Andalusian Center for Marine Science and Technology, sponsored by the University of Cádiz. CACYTMAR
Institute of Marine Science of Andalusia. ICMAN
Marine Research units of AZTI, located in multiple cities in the  Basque region. AZTI
Marine Sciences Institute in Barcelona. ICM
Marine Technology Unit, part of the Spanish National Research Council. UTM
Oceanic Platform of the Canary Islands. PLOCAN
Spanish Institute of Oceanology, Madrid. IEO

Sri Lanka 
National Aquatic Resources Research and Development Agency. NARA
Ocean University of Sri Lanka in Colombo.
University of Ruhuna, Faculty of Fisheries and Marine Sciences & Technology. FMST

Sweden
Baltic Sea Science Center, Skansen, Stockholm.
Stockholm University’s Baltic Sea Centre, based in Stockholm but with a laboratory in Asko. Baltic Sea Centre
Swedish Maritime Robotics Centre, Stockholm. SMaRC
University of Gothenburg, Department of Marine Sciences, including Kristineberg Marine Research Station and Tjärnö Marine Laboratory. Marina Vetenskaper

Taiwan
China Maritime Institute in Taipei City. Maritime Institute 
National Sun Yat-sen University, College of Marine Sciences. Marine NSYSU
National Academy of Marine Research in Kaohsiung.
National Dong Hwa University, Institute of Marine Biotechnology. NDHU
National Taiwan Normal University, Institute of Marine Environmental Science and Technology. NTNU
National Taiwan Ocean University in Zhongzheng, Keelung. NTOU
National Taiwan University, Institute of Oceanography. NTU OC
Taiwan Ocean Research Institute, Kaohsiung. TORI

Tanzania
Western Indian Ocean Marine Science Association, headquartered in Zanzibar.

Turkey
Dokuz Eylül University, Institute of Marine Sciences and Technology, Izmir. DEU
Institute of Marine Sciences, part of Middle East Technical University, Erdemli and Mersin. IMS
Istanbul University, Institute of Marine Sciences and Management. Deniz Bilimleri
Office of Navigation, Hydrography and Oceanography, part of the Turkish Navy. ONHO

United Kingdom
Bangor University, School of Ocean Sciences. Ocean Sciences
British Oceanographic Data Centre in Liverpool. BODC
Challenger Society for Marine Science, a learned society.
FSC Millport, formerly known as the University Marine Biological Station Millport, on the Firth of Clyde, Scotland.
Dove Marine Laboratory  in North Shields, associated with Newcastle University.
Gatty Marine Laboratory, associated with the University of St. Andrews, Scotland.
Marine Biological Association of the United Kingdom, Plymouth, Devon.
Marine Scotland Directorate, formerly called Marine Scotland Science, headquartered in Leith, Edinburgh.
Met Office Hadley Centre, Exeter. Met Office
National Oceanography Centre including the National Oceanography Centre, Southampton.
National Tidal and Sea Level Facility, including the UK National Tide Gauge Network. NTSLF
Plymouth Marine Laboratory in Devon.
Proudman Oceanographic Laboratory in Liverpool.
Scott Polar Research Institute, Cambridge. SPRI
Scottish Association for Marine Science, Dunstaffnage, Oban. SAMS

United States
National agencies and non-profit organizations:
Integrated Ocean Observing System, a network of regional observing systems.
Ocean Observatories Initiative, a collaboration between WHOI, OSU, UW, and Rutgers.
NASA Goddard Space Flight Center’s Ocean Biology and Biogeochemistry Program 
National Data Buoy Center
National Oceanic and Atmospheric Administration, within which there are several affiliate “joint” programs co-hosted by other institutions. 
National Undersea Research Program
Naval Oceanographic Office, Stennis Space Center, Mississippi, also home to the Naval Meteorology and Oceanography Command. NAVOCEANO
Schmidt Ocean Institute
Sea Education Association, also known as SEA Semester. SEA
University-National Oceanographic Laboratory System. UNOLS

Universities with oceanography programs:

Northeast:
Bigelow Laboratory for Ocean Sciences in Maine. Bigelow
University of Maine, School of Marine Sciences based in Orono and the Downeast Institute at the Machias campus.
Lamont–Doherty Earth Observatory associated with Columbia University in Palisades, New York.
Marine Biological Laboratory in Woods Hole, Massachusetts, associated with the University of Chicago. MBL
Northeastern University, Marine Science Center, East Point, Nahant, Massachusetts. Marine Science Center
Stony Brook University, School of Marine and Atmospheric Sciences, on Long Island, New York State. SoMAS
Princeton University’s Geophysical Fluid Dynamics Laboratory, New Jersey. 
Rutgers University, Department of Marine and Coastal Sciences, is based in New Brunswick, New Jersey with other marine science field stations in New Jersey. 
University of Connecticut, Department of Marine Sciences, at the Avery Point campus near Groton, Connecticut, also host to the National Undersea Research Center for the North Atlantic and Great Lakes. DMS
Woods Hole Oceanographic Institution on Cape Cod, Massachusetts. WHOI
University of Delaware, College of Earth, Ocean and Environment, which has a campus in Lewes, Delaware. CEOE
University of Massachusetts Dartmouth, School for Marine Science & Technology. SMAST
University of New Hampshire’s School of Marine Science and Ocean Engineering, Center for Coastal & Ocean Mapping, and Shoals Marine Laboratory.
University of New England (United States) has programs in marine science at the Biddeford, Maine campus. Marine Programs.
University of Rhode Island’s Graduate School of Oceanography, also has a Center for Ocean Exploration and Archaeological Oceanography.

Southeast:

Duke University Marine Laboratory near Beaufort, North Carolina. Duke Marine Lab
Halmos College of Natural Sciences and Oceanography at Nova Southeastern University, Florida.
Harbor Branch Oceanographic Institution at Florida Atlantic University in Fort Pierce, Florida. HBOI
Florida Institute of Technology, School of Marine and Environmental Technology in Melbourne, Florida. 
Florida State University, Department of Earth, Ocean & Atmospheric Science in Talahassee and Coastal Marine Laboratory in St. Teresa. EOAS 
Old Dominion University, department of Ocean & Earth Sciences, Norfolk, Virginia. OES
Rosenstiel School of Marine and Atmospheric Science, University of Miami, Florida. RSMAS
Skidaway Institute of Oceanography, Georgia. SKIO
University of Georgia Marine Institute on Sapelo Island. UGAMI
University of North Carolina at Wilmington, Center for Marine Science. UNCW CMS
University of South Carolina, School of the Earth, Ocean and Environment headquartered in Columbia, South Carolina, as well as the Baruch Institute, a research station near Georgetown, South Carolina. SEOE
Virginia Institute of Marine Science, located in Gloucester Point, Virginia, part of William & Mary. VIMS
Whitney Laboratory for Marine Bioscience, part of the University of Florida, in Saint Augustine. Whitney Laboratory

Gulf Coast:

Dauphin Island Sea Lab on the barrier island where Fort Gaines is located, part of the University of South Alabama.  DISL
Florida Institute of Oceanography, housed at the University of South Florida St. Petersburg. FIO
Louisiana State University, College of the Coast & Environment. CCE
Texas A&M University, Department of Oceanography, based in College Station, Texas but with a campus in Galveston, Texas. TAMU Oceanography
University of Southern Mississippi, School of Ocean Science and Engineering, with locations in Long Beach, Ocean Springs, and the Stennis Space Center. SOSE
University of Texas Marine Science Institute in Port Aransas, Texas. UTMSI

West Coast:

Cal Poly Humboldt, Marine Sciences program, Arcata, California. Humboldt Marine Sciences
Center for the Blue Economy in Monterey, California, managed by the Middlebury Institute of International Studies. 
Hawaii Pacific University in Honolulu and Kaneohe, Hawaii.
Hatfield Marine Science Center in Newport, Oregon is operated by Oregon State University, College of Earth, Ocean, and Atmospheric Sciences. CEOAS
Hopkins Marine Station, run by Stanford University, in Monterey, California. Hopkins
Monterey Bay Aquarium Research Institute in Monterey, California. MBARI
Moss Landing Marine Laboratories, run by the California State University system, in Moss Landing, California. MLML
Naval Postgraduate School, Monterey, California. NPS
Pacific Marine Environmental Laboratory, part of NOAA, split between Newport, Oregon and Seattle, Washington. PMEL
San Diego State University operates the Coastal Waters Laboratory in San Diego, California.
Scripps Institution of Oceanography, associated with the University of California San Diego, in La Jolla, California. Scripps
Southern California Marine Institute, a multi-campus research station on Terminal Island in the Los Angeles area.
University of Alaska Fairbanks, College of Fisheries and Ocean Sciences, which also houses the Cooperative Institute for Arctic Research, is based in Fairbanks, Alaska and also has a small station in Seward, Alaska. CFOS
University of California Davis, Coastal and Marine Sciences Institute, which also runs the Bodega Marine Laboratory and Bodega Marine Reserve in Sonoma County, California. UCDavis Marine Science
University of California Santa Barbara, Marine Science Institute. UCSB MSI
University of California Santa Cruz Coastal Science Campus, Institute of Marine Sciences. UCSC IMS
University of Hawaii at Manoa’s School of Ocean and Earth Science and Technology houses the Center for Microbial Oceanography: Research and Education and the Hawaii Undersea Research Laboratory.  SOEST
University of Washington, School of Oceanography, Seattle, Washington. UW Ocean
Western Washington University, Shannon Point Marine Center, Anacortes, Washington. SPMC

Inland and Great Lakes:

National Center for Atmospheric Research, Boulder, Colorado.
University Corporation for Atmospheric Research, Boulder, Colorado.
University of Colorado Boulder, which houses the Cooperative Institute for Research in Environmental Sciences and the Institute of Arctic and Alpine Research.
University of Michigan, Department of Earth and Environmental Sciences, Oceanography program. U-M

Venezuela
Oceanographic Institute of Venezuela in Cumana.

Vietnam 
 Institute of Marine Environment and Resources in Haiphong, part of the Vietnam Academy of Science and Technology. IMER
 Institute of Marine Geology and Geophysics in Hanoi, part of the Vietnam Academy of Science and Technology.  IMGG 
 International Centre for Interdisciplinary Science and Education in Quy Nhon, Binh Dinh. ICISE
 Nha Trang Oceanography Institute in Khánh Hòa Province. VNIO
 University of Science and Technology of Hanoi, Water-Earth-Environment Program. WEO

See also

:Category:Oceanographic organizations
:Category:Fisheries and aquaculture research institutes
Earth science
List of environmental research institutes
List of research vessels by country
Oceanography
Outline of Earth sciences
Outline of oceanography

References

Geography-related lists
Earth sciences
Environmental science
Lists of places
Lists of universities and colleges
Maritime organizations

Oceanography